Eliot Otis Brown Walters (born 4 February 1993) is a British actor, known for his role as Ryan in the BBC television drama Summerhill about the school by the same name.

Career
Eliot started acting when he was eight and has been a member of the Central Junior Television Workshop
(which also produced Oscar-nominated film star Samantha Morton) ever since. His first starring role was in 2002, where he was featured in the movie Once Upon a Time in the Midlands. In 2004, Eliot had his second starring role in children's drama, Help! I'm a Teenage Outlaw shot in Czech Republic but he had to have his appendix removed two weeks into filming. In 2006, Eliot had a guest appearance in Murphy's Law and in 2007 Eliot had another guest appearance in the film Control. In 2008, Eliot landed the role of Ryan in BAFTA Award-winning children's drama, Summerhill and he subsequently won the Children's BAFTA award in the category Breakthrough Talent for his role in the series. He received the award from Keith Chegwin and George Sampson at a ceremony in London on 30 November 2008 and dedicated it to his family and acting workshop. In 2009, Eliot landed another starring role as Daz in the film Butterfly. Since appearing in Summerhill, he has had numerous guest roles in The Bill, Doctors and Casualty between 2008 and 2010. He briefly appeared in 2011 Kids TV series The Sparticle Mystery as character Jed. He can currently be seen in the E4 TV series My Mad Fat Diary as Big G, a bully and nemesis to the main character, Rae.

Filmography

Film

Television

Guest Appearances

References

External links
 
 Central Television Workshop report on Eliot's Bafta win

1993 births
Living people
English male child actors
English male television actors
21st-century English male actors
Actors from Nottingham